Jonny Steinberg (born 22 March 1970) is a South African writer and scholar. He is the author of several books about everyday life in the wake of South Africa's transition to democracy. Two of them, Midlands (2002), about the murder of a white South African farmer, and The Number (2004), a biography of a prison gangster, won the Sunday Times Alan Paton Award. In 2013, Steinberg was awarded the Windham-Campbell Literature Prize.

Biography 
Steinberg was born and raised in South Africa. He was educated at Wits University in Johannesburg, and at the University of Oxford, where he was a Rhodes Scholar and earned a doctorate in political theory. He has worked as a journalist at a South African national daily newspaper, written scripts for television drama, and has been a consultant to the South African government on criminal justice policy. Until 2020, he was Professor of African Studies at Oxford University. He currently lectures part-time at the Council on African Studies at Yale University.

Books 
Steinberg's first two books Midlands (2002), about the murder of a white South African farmer, and The Number (2004), a biography of a prison gangster, won South Africa's premier non-fiction award, the Sunday Times Alan Paton Award.

His books also include Three-Letter Plague (published as Sizwe's Test in the United States), which chronicles a young man's journey through South Africa's AIDS pandemic. It was a Washington Post Book of the Year  and was shortlisted for the Wellcome Trust Book Prize. Steinberg is also the author of Thin Blue (2008), an exploration of the unwritten rules of engagement between South African civilians and police, and Little Liberia: An African Odyssey in New York (2011), about the Liberian civil war and its aftermath in an exile community in New York and described as an "extraordinary, stylistically varied mix of reportage, history and biography".

Steinberg's 2015 book, A Man of Good Hope, was described by Observer reviewer Ian Birrell, who wrote: "On the surface, it is simply the biography of a lonely young migrant who dreams of a decent life, hardening his shell and hustling to survive in hostile human environments. Yet it is really an epic African saga that chronicles some fundamental modern issues such as crime, human trafficking, migration, poverty and xenophobia, while giving glimpses into the Somali clan system, repression in Ethiopia and lethal racism in townships." The book was adapted into a stage production by Mark Dornford-May.

Steinberg's dual biography of Winnie Madikizela and Nelson Mandela, Winnie & Nelson: Portrait of a Marriage, is due to be published in May 2023.

Awards and honours
2013: Windham–Campbell Literature Prize
2020: Media24 Books Literary Prize: Recht Malan Prize for Nonfiction

Bibliography
 Midlands. Johannesburg: Jonathan Ball Publishers, 2002. xii, 259 pages. 
 The Number: One Man's Search for Identity in the Cape Underworld and Prison Gangs. Johannesburg: Jonathan Ball Publishers, 2004. 427 pages. 
"Nongoloza's Children: Western Cape Prison Gangs During and After Apartheid", Centre for the Study of Violence and Reconciliation, 2004
 Notes from a Fractured Country. Johannesburg: Jonathan Ball Publishers, 2007
 Sizwe's Test. New York: Simon and Schuster, February 2008. Hardcover, 368 pages. ; 
 Thin Blue: The Unwritten Rules of Policing South Africa. Johannesburg: Jonathan Ball Publishers, August 2008.
 Three-Letter Plague. Johannesburg: Jonathan Ball Publishers, March 2008; Vintage Random House, December 2008
 Little Liberia: An African Odyssey in New York. London: Jonathan Cape Random House, January 2011; Johannesburg: Jonathan Ball Publishers, March 2011
 A Man of Good Hope. London: Jonathan Cape, 2015; . New York: Knopf, 2015; 
 One Day in Bethlehem. London: Jonathan Ball Publishers, 2019; .

References

External links
 African Studies Centre, University of Oxford
 Department of Political Science, Yale University

1970 births
South African LGBT writers
Living people
South African non-fiction writers
South African Rhodes Scholars